The Maine Intercollegiate Athletic Association was an intercollegiate athletic football conference that existed from 1893 to 1973. The conference's four members were all located in the state of Maine. Maine was a joint member of the MIAA and the Yankee Conference from 1946 to 1964; the remaining three colleges now constitute the Colby-Bates-Bowdoin Consortium and compete in the New England Small College Athletic Conference.

Members

Champions

1893 – Bowdoin
1894 – Bowdoin
1895 – Bowdoin
1896 – Bowdoin
1897 – Bates and Colby
1898 – Bates
1899 – Bates
1900 – Bates & Bowdoin
1901 – Maine
1902 – Maine
1903 – Maine
1904 – Bowdoin
1905 – Maine
1906 – Bates
1907 – Bowdoin
1908 – Bowdoin & Colby
1909 – Colby
1910 – Bowdoin
1911 – Maine
1912 – Maine
1913 – Maine
1914 – Colby
1915 – Maine
1916 – Colby
1917 – Bowdoin
1918 – No champion
1919 – Maine
1920 – Maine

1921 – Bowdoin
1922 – Maine
1923 – Colby
1924 – Maine
1925 – Maine
1926 – Maine
1927 – Colby and Maine
1928 – Colby and Maine
1929 – Bates
1930 – Bates
1931 – Maine
1932 – Maine
1933 – Maine
1934 – Maine
1935 – Bowdoin
1936 – Bowdoin
1937 – Bowdoin
1938 – Bowdoin and Colby
1939 – Bowdoin and Colby
1940 – Bowdoin and Colby
1941 – Colby
1942 – Bowdoin
1943 – No champion
1944 – No champion
1945 – No champion
1946 – Bates
1947 – Maine

1948 – Bates, Bowdoin, and Maine
1949 – Bowdoin
1950 – Bowdoin and Maine
1951 – Maine
1952 – Bowdoin
1953 – Maine
1954 – Maine
1955 – Maine
1956 – Bates
1957 – Bates, Colby, and Maine
1958 – Colby
1959 – Colby
1960 – Bowdoin
1961 – Maine
1962 – Maine
1963 – Bowdoin
1964 – Maine
1965 – Bates, Bowdoin, and Colby
1966 – Bates
1967 – Bates
1968 – Bowdoin
1969 – Bowdoin
1970 – Bowdoin
1971 – Bowdoin
1972 – Colby
1973 – Bowdoin

See also
List of defunct college football conferences

References

Defunct college sports conferences in the United States
College sports in Maine